This is an incomplete List of ghost towns in Wisconsin.

Ghost towns

Notes and references

Further reading

External links
Ghost Towns.com-Wisconsin
A history of the origin of the place names connected with the Chicago & North Western and Chicago, St. Paul, Minneapolis & Omaha railways
http://www.wisconsinhistory.org/odd/archives/001963.asp Wisconsin Historical Society-Odd Wisconsin-Archives-Wisconsin Ghost Town
http://articles.chicagotribune.com/1988-05-12/news/8803160500_1_ghost-towns-lumber-production-sawmills Ghost Towns Haunt Wisconsin As Lumbering Ends
 Wisconsin Public Television - Lost Towns of Southern Wisconsin

http://rootsweb.ancestry.com/~witttp/ghosttowns/ghosttown.htm Wisconsin Ghost Towns at Rootsweb.

 
Wisconsin
Ghost towns